Mathias Zdarsky (25 February 1856 – 20 June 1940) was an early ski pioneer and is considered one of the founders of modern Alpine skiing technique: Arnold Lunn described him as the "father of alpine skiing". He was probably Austria's first ski instructor. He was also a teacher, painter and sculptor.

Biography
Zdarsky was born on 25 February 1856 in Kožichovice in Moravia, then Austria-Hungary, present Czech Republic.

Inspired by Norway's Fridtjof Nansen's 1888 crossing of Greenland, he adapted skis for use on alpine terrain. In 1890, he developed a steel binding (the "Lilienfelder Stahlsohlenbindung"), which made steep mountain slopes and gate runs possible. Zdarsky felt the earlier bindings did not hold the foot firmly enough, and so he designed binding with a strong, sprung, steel sole, which is the basis of modern ski bindings. As in the earlier Norwegian skiing, he used only one ski pole. Unlike today, the skier steered by using their elbows.

In January 1905, Zdarsky demonstrated a steep downhill descent, and was among the first to publicize this development in Central Europe. To show the superiority of his ski technology, he skied the "Breite Ries" at Schneeberg, Austria. On 19 March 1905 he organized the first alpine ski race (on the Muckenkogel via Lilienfeld, Austria) (though Crans-Montana in Switzerland had already run the first Kandahar descent race, in January 1901). This event had 24 participants, however it attained little attention beyond ski enthusiasts. In 1922 the Englishman Arnold Lunn invented the shorter, but more difficult slalom race, which had greater appeal.

During World War I,  he taught mountain troops skiing and advanced avalanche training. He described his skiing techniques in his book Die Lilienfelder Skilauf-Technik (The Lilienfelder Ski Method). First published in 1897, seventeen editions were published up to 1925. He died in St. Pölten, Austria on 20 June 1940.

Legacy
During his lifetime, nobody suspected Zdarsky had created the basis for a popular sport, and he was considered something of an eccentric inventor. He is also thought to be the inventor of the bivouac sack. 

Honors received include:
 1905 honorary member of Ski Club of Great Britain
 1916 Knight's Cross Order of Franz Joseph  
 1931 Gold Medal for Services to the Republic of Austria
 1936 Cross of the Austrian Order of Merit
 1937 honorary member of Austrian Ski Association
 1965 monument in Lilienfeld park

Named in his memory:
 Mount Zdarsky in Antarctica
 1951 Zdarskyweg in Vienna - Hietzing 
 1977 Zdarskystraße in St. Pölten- Spratzern
 annual Muckenkogel Traisner Hütte mid-March nostalgia ski race 
 double black diamond trail at Taos Ski Valley

References

General references
 Zdarsky, Mathias (1897) Lilienfelder Skilauf-Technik Hamburg: Verlagsanst OCLC 601422411
 Schlesinger, Paul (1942) "Mathias Zdarsky, the Pioneer of Alpine Skiing" American Alpine Journal pg 403-405
 Ponstingl, Michael (2005) Mathias Zdarskys "Posen des Wissens". Zu einer fotografischen Kodierung des Skifahrens (Mathias Zdarskys "Bits of Wisdom". A photographic manual of ski turns), in: Markwart Herzog (ed.), Skilauf – Volkssport – Medienzirkus. Skisport als Kulturphänomen (Ski Racing - Popular Sport - Media Circus: Sport Skiing as Cultural Phenomenon), Stuttgart: Kohlhammer Verlag, (Irseer Dialogue [Dialogues of Irsee], Bd./vol. 11), pp. 123–149.
 Allen, John (2008) "Mathias Zdarsky: The Father of Alpine Skiing" Skiing Heritage Journal Vol. 20, No. 1 pp 8–14
 Mathias Zdarsky - 1856-1940 from Lilienfeld museum

External links
 
 Zdarsky ski museum in Lilienfeld, Austria (in German)
 Zdarsky archives (in German)

Austrian male alpine skiers
Austrian mountain climbers
19th-century Austrian painters
19th-century Austrian male artists
Austrian male painters
20th-century Austrian painters
Austrian sculptors
Austrian male sculptors
Czech male alpine skiers
Czech mountain climbers
Czech painters
Czech male painters
Czech sculptors
Czech male sculptors
Austrian people of Czech descent
People from Třebíč District
1856 births
1940 deaths
20th-century sculptors
19th-century sculptors
20th-century Austrian male artists